This was a former WTA 125K tennis tournament.

The tournament was not held between 2013–16 due to various reasons, but in 2017 it was reinstated as a WTA 125K series tournament and relocated to Mumbai.

The Maharashtra State Lawn Tennis Association (MSLTA) and the Maharashtra State Government came together to reinstate the event, the first of its kind to be held in India since 2012 and the second overall in almost a decade. The Cricket Club of India hosted the event in 2017.

The 2017 and 2018 editions were sponsored by Larsen & Toubro.

Past finals

Singles

Doubles

See also
 WTA Indian Open
 Royal Indian Open

References

External links
 Official website

Bangalore Open
Tennis tournaments in India
Sport in Bangalore
Hard court tennis tournaments
WTA Tour
Recurring sporting events established in 2017
Recurring events disestablished in 2018
Defunct tennis tournaments in India
Sport in Hyderabad, India
Defunct sports competitions in India
WTA 125 tournaments
Sport in Pune
Sport in Mumbai
Royal Indian Open